Hannah Cooper (born 10 June 1979) is a Liberian hurdler. She competed in the women's 100 metres hurdles at the 2000 Summer Olympics.

References

1979 births
Living people
Athletes (track and field) at the 2000 Summer Olympics
Liberian female hurdlers
Olympic athletes of Liberia
Place of birth missing (living people)